Nicolas Marini (born 29 July 1993) is an Italian professional racing cyclist, who most recently rode for UCI Continental team .

Major results

2010
 2nd  Mixed team, Summer Youth Olympics
2011
 8th Road race, UCI Junior Road World Championships
2014
 1st La Popolarissima
 3rd Circuito del Porto
2015
 1st Stage 3 Tour of Japan
 2nd Overall Tour of China II
1st Stages 2, 3 & 6
 7th Scheldeprijs
2016
 1st Stage 8 Tour of Qinghai Lake
 1st Stage 5 Tour of China I
 1st Stage 4 Tour of Taihu Lake
 10th Overall Tour of China II
2017
 1st Stage 12 Tour of Qinghai Lake
 1st Stage 1 Tour of Taihu Lake
2018
 1st Stage 2 Tour of Albania

References

External links
 

1993 births
Living people
People from Iseo, Lombardy
Italian male cyclists
Cyclists from the Province of Brescia
Cyclists at the 2010 Summer Youth Olympics